Journal of Science may refer to:

 American Journal of Science
 Caribbean Journal of Science
 Ceylon Journal of Science
 South African Journal of Science
 Journal of Science (1878–1885), formerly Quarterly Journal of Science, British periodical

See also
List of scientific journals
 Science (journal)